Xurpas Inc. is a consumer technology company. Its headquarters is located in Makati Manila, Philippines. The company focuses on different business activities within the IT industry through its product and service based business.

History 
Xurpas was founded in Philippines in 2001. Its founders are Nico Jose "Nix" Nolledo, Fernando Jude Garcia and Raymond Racaza.  The company started with a start up capital of ₱62,500 pesos, they met while working at iAyala Company, Incorporated an internet company arm of Ayala Corporation at that time, they are into programming and like developing programs and apps, they used to work inside an office that looks like a garage, it is the small office of Nix Nolledo's father, the company was bootstrap early on, from 2002 to 2013 the company pivoted their business model and grew their mobile and application based business and services.

2014 - 2018 - First Filipino tech company ever to IPO, company losses and stock price fallout 
In 2014 Xurpas has filed for Initial public offering. It is currently listed in the Philippine Stock Exchange.

By 2015 Xurpas formed Xeleb Inc. which saw the firm venturing into celebrity based mobile app games the celebrities included are: Anne Curtis, Isabelle Daza, Kim Atienza and Erwan Heussaff as principal shareholders. Xurpas create AldubYou mobile game in 2015 as well riding on the cult like success of the AlDub team of Maine Mendoza and Alden Richards, Xurpas teamed up with Eat Bulaga producer Tape Inc. to launch the mobile game.  On that same year Xurpas acquires 51% stake of Yondu Inc. a subsidiary of Globle Telecom Inc. additionally Xurpas buys into Singapore-based gaming firm MatchMe.

In 2015 ahead of 2016 Philippine Election polls Xurpas wants to raise approximately $70 million (₱3.3 billion pesos) from a mix of equity offerings for 2016 to be able to keep up with its regional expansion plan. In early 2016 Xurpas buys 23.53% stake in Hong Kong based Micro Benefits.

The first-ever Filipino tech company to go public Xurpas has a rough 2016 just a year after its IPO as its stock bombed and tumbles. On that same year Xurpas began buying shares to increase its stock value.

By 2017 Xurpas stock continues to tumble after more than two years of its debut in the Philippine Stock Exchange as it's stock price continues to go down as it lost half of its price from its peak as market expectations leveled down and this comes also with a string of acquisitions made by the company that have yet to bear fruit.

Xurpas posted a ₱812 million loss in 2018 signaling that the company woes is far from over, early in the year of 2018 the company announced a management revamp and the engagement of financial adviser. It is disclosed on the Philippine Stock Exchange that it had posted a loss of ₱812 million in 2018. The figure reversing a ₱103 million profit in 2017, included impairment losses and a write-down in one of its overseas subsidiaries.

2019 - Present - Stock trading suspension, backdoor listing, stock trading suspension lifted and company's future uncertain 
On January 30, 2019, after just six months Raymond Racaza steps down as Xurpas CEO. Xurpas posts ₱71 million loss as its mobile business slows, the company trimmed its losses in the first quarler of 2019 as it boosted its own enterprise business and recorded lower costs and expenses during the three-month period. The company posted a net loss of ₱70.61 million in the January to March period, 6.6% lower than it's attributable net loss of ₱75.63 million in the same period last year. On that same year Xurpas halted the operation of Xeleb Inc. and sells Yondu Inc. back to Globe Telecom.

Xurpas stock trading was suspended in 2020, it also embarks on backdoor listing that same year, The Philippine Stock Exchange will not lift the trading suspension on shares of Xurpas after deciding that its planned ₱170.7 million acquisition of venture capital firm Wavemaker Partners US qualifies, as a backdoor listing. On September 20, 2020, Xurpas gets board nod to acquire US tech venture capital firm Wavemaker. In 2021 a buy in deal that would serve as a gateway for Xurpas to enter the vibrant US tech investing arena and an opportunity to participate in the hunt for unicorns has been halted.

On January 17, 2022, Xurpas stock trading suspension has been lifted, after a 16-month suspension the Philippine Stock Exchange(PSE) will allow the technology firm to resume trading on its bourse after the firm submitted a comprehensive disclosure on its aborted backdoor listing deal with US-based Wavemaker group. Xurpas plummets on the first day of trading after 16 month suspension. In early 2022, Xurpas raises ₱100 million to expand in "IT Augmentation" business.

IT veteran will take the lead at Xurpas as Nico Jose "Nix" Nolledo stepped down as chairman after establishing the company in 2001 his resignation has taken effect last June 6, 2022, he will be replaced by Joey Gurango as the new chairman and CEO of the listed technology company.

On December 14, 2022, Xurpas Inc.'s board of directors has given a green light and approved the incorporation of the wholly owned subsidiary under Philippine laws. The subsidiary will be called Xurpas Software Inc., or any other name as may be approved by Philippines Security and Exchange Commission upon filing of the requirements for company registration or incorporation.

In early 2023 Xurpas is planning to establish a subsidiary in Australia, the company stated:

"We intend to establish the Xurpas brand in Australia through a new subsidiary," Xurpas Inc. said. "Xurpas will offer a range of IT (information technology) services through the new subsidiary, ranging from staff augmentation and managed services, to bespoke software development, among others."

In continued that with this decision, the company has the possibility to establish a sales presence in the Australian continent, allowing the company to offer its products and services in a market that is larger than the Philippine market.

Corporate affairs

Leadership

Board of directors 
As of December, 2021 the board of directors of Xurpas includes:

 Nico Jose S. Nolledo (advisor)
 Alexander D. Corpuz (Director, President, Chief Information Officer and Chief Finance Officer)
 Fernando Jude F. Garcia (Director, Treasurer and Chief Technology Officer)
 Mercedita S. Nolledo (director)
 Wilfredo O. Racaza (director)
 Jonathan Gerard A. Gurango (Independent Director)
 Imelda C. Tiongson (Independent Director)
 Bartolome S. Silayan, Jr (Independent Director

Subsidiaries 
Xurpas lists of updated subsidiaries:

Finances 
For the fiscal (and calendar) year 2021, Xurpas reported a net income and or loss of ₱(26.16) million. The annual revenue was ₱210.03 million, an increase of 21% over the previous fiscal year. Below is the lists of revenue, net income, loss and total assets up to the current year period.

Ownership 
Lists of Xurpas updated top five largest ownership and statistics of shareholdings.

References

External links 

 Official Website
 Xurpas Enterprise Website

Software companies established in 2001
Companies listed on the Philippine Stock Exchange
Business software companies
Technology companies
Technology companies of the Philippines
Mobile software development